{{DISPLAYTITLE:C24H31FO5}}
The molecular formula C24H31FO5 may refer to:

 Descinolone acetonide, a synthetic glucocorticoid corticosteroid which was never marketed
 Fluorometholone acetate, a synthetic glucocorticoid corticosteroid and a corticosteroid ester, as well as a progestogen and progestogen ester